Ingleside is the penultimate commuter railroad station along Metra's Milwaukee District North Line in Ingleside, Illinois. The station is officially located on Washington Street and Rollins Road (Lake County Roads 31 and A20), however the actual location is off of Rollins Road itself. In Metra's zone-based fare system, Ingleside is in zone J. As of 2018, Ingleside is the 205th busiest of Metra's 236 non-downtown stations, with an average of 63 weekday boardings. The station exists along a railroad line that originally served the Chicago, Milwaukee, St. Paul and Pacific Railroad.

As of December 12, 2022, Ingleside is served as a flag stop by 27 trains (12 inbound, 15 outbound) on weekdays, by 18 trains (nine in each direction) on Saturdays, and by all 18 trains (nine in each direction) on Sundays and holidays.

Ingleside station is little more than an enclosed shelter. Parking is available along the north side of the tracks on the southeast corner of Jefferson Avenue and Rollins Road to a plot of land that is in line with Madison Avenue, a street that dead ends north of Rollins Road. Washington Street merely intersects with Rollins Road and the main parking lot entrance. The station is near locations such as Duck Lake and Fox Lake Veterans Memorial Park.

Bus connections
Pace
 570 Fox Lake-CLC

References

External links

Flickr Photo
Station House from Google Maps Street View

Ingleside
Former Chicago, Milwaukee, St. Paul and Pacific Railroad stations
Railway stations in Lake County, Illinois